Spöck may refer to:

Spöck (Eider), a river of Schleswig-Holstein, Germany
Spöck, a village in Baden-Württemberg, Germany, now part of the town of Stutensee
Spöck, a village in Bavaria, Germany, now part of the town of Kirchheim in Schwaben
FC Spöck, a German football club in the Verbandsliga Baden

See also
Spock (disambiguation)